Claire Hooper (born 1978 in London) is a British artist based in London, England.

Exhibitions
Hooper has shown in Europe and elsewhere, including shows at Lothringer 13, Munich; MUMOK, Vienna; Sketch, London; IT Park Taipei; Kunstwerke, Berlin, and various Serpentine gallery events. Hooper is known for her work with video, including Nyx (2010), Aoide (2011) and Eris (2012), Hooper has also made large scale watercolour paintings including Clay as Bread and Dust as Wine (2016), a 1:1 scale ‘copy’ of an imagined archaeological site in ancient Mesopotamia. She is represented by Hollybush Gardens London  and her work is distributed by LUX.

Awards
Hooper was the 2010 winner of the Baloise Art Prize Art Statements, Art Basel.

References

External links
 Claire Hooper Online Portfolio on Archive.org
 Claire Hooper Interview: Flash Art Magazine on Archive.org

1978 births
Living people
Artists from London
Bâloise Prize winners
British video artists
Women video artists
English contemporary artists